Davit Hakobyan (born 21 March 1993) is an Armenian footballer who plays as a midfielder and has appeared for the Armenia national team.

Career
Hakobyan made his international debut for Armenia on 1 June 2016, coming on as a substitute in the 73rd minute for Tigran Barseghyan in a friendly match against El Salvador, which finished as a 4–0 win. He made his first competitive appearance on 11 October 2016, coming on as a substitute in the 85th minute for Marcos Pizzelli in a 2018 FIFA World Cup qualification match against Poland, which finished as a 1–2 away loss.

Career statistics

International

References

External links
 
 
 
 

1993 births
Living people
Footballers from Gyumri
Armenian footballers
FC Shirak players
Armenian Premier League players
Armenia youth international footballers
Armenia under-21 international footballers
Armenia international footballers
Association football midfielders